Camdeboo Local Municipality was a local municipality in the Sarah Baartman District Municipality of the Eastern Cape in South Africa. After municipal elections on 3 August 2016 it was merged into the larger Dr Beyers Naudé Local Municipality.

The name Camdeboo (or Qamdobowa in Xhosa language) has evolved from a phonetically similar Khoi word meaning "green hollow".

Main places
The 2011 census divided the municipality into the following main places:

Politics 

The municipal council consisted of fourteen members elected by mixed-member proportional representation. Seven councillors were elected by first-past-the-post voting in seven wards, while the remaining seven were chosen from party lists so that the total number of party representatives was proportional to the number of votes received. In the election of 18 May 2011 the African National Congress (ANC) won a majority of eight seats on the council.
The following table shows the results of the election.

References

External links
 Official website

Former local municipalities of South Africa